The Australian cricket team toured Sri Lanka from 6 August to 20 September 2011. The tour consisted of two Twenty20 Internationals (T20Is), five One Day Internationals (ODIs) and three Tests played for Warne–Muralitharan Trophy. Four uncapped players had been named in the Australian Test squad; Shaun Marsh, Trent Copeland, James Pattinson and Nathan Lyon. Lyon had only made four first-class appearances and was previously one of the groundstaff at the Adelaide Oval.

Squads

Tour matches

First-class: SL Board XI Vs Australia

T20I series

1st T20I

2nd T20I

ODI series

1st ODI

2nd ODI

3rd ODI

4th ODI

5th ODI

Test series (Warne–Muralitharan Trophy)

1st Test

On the 2nd day of the test, Nathan Lyon took his first wicket in tests with his first ball, his victim was Kumar Sangakkara; he is the 14th international player and 2nd Australian to do so. He finished with figures of 5/34, becoming the 131st player to take five wickets on debut in a Test match. Also, Trent Copeland took his first wicket in tests with his second ball; his victim was Tillakaratne Dilshan.

Australia lead the series 1–0

2nd Test

Ricky Ponting missed this test. Ponting's wife, Rianna, gave birth to the couple's second child, and he returned to Australia to witness the event. As a result, Shaun Marsh made his debut and he scored 141 off 315 balls.

Australia lead the series 1–0

3rd Test

On the first day  Shaminda Eranga got his first wicket in tests with his first ball (repeating Nathan Lyon's feat in the 1st test); his victim was Shane Watson. Also on the first day Shaun Marsh achieved an average of 222 before he got out, the highest ever by an Australian. Michael Hussey was Man of the Match for all three test matches and was awarded Man of the Series.

Australia won the series 1-0

References

2011 in Australian cricket
2011 in Sri Lankan cricket
2011
International cricket competitions in 2011
Sri Lankan cricket seasons from 2000–01